Fridericia ulrikae is a species of annelid belonging to the family Enchytraeidae.

It is native to Northern Europe.

References

Enchytraeidae
Animals described in 1999